Elisabeth Barléon (born 10 September 1983) is a French Paralympic archer.

She has competed once at the Summer Paralympics and once at the Para Continental Championships.

References

External links 
 
 
 

1983 births
Living people
French female archers
Paralympic archers of France
Archers at the 2016 Summer Paralympics
21st-century French women